Toni Hahto (born 7 April 1982) is a retired Finnish footballer who represented Vaasan Palloseura of Veikkausliiga.

References

 Guardian Football

1982 births
Living people
Finnish footballers
Association football defenders
Vaasan Palloseura players